Alexander Springs Wilderness is located in the U.S. state of Florida and was designated in 1984 by the United States Congress. The wilderness has a total of 7,941 acres (32 km2) and is within Ocala National Forest, which is the oldest National Forest east of the Mississippi River. Alexander Springs is home to a variety of wildlife including otters, alligators, and turtles. The wilderness also contains the only 1st magnitude spring in all the U.S. National Forests and 
Parks. Alexander Springs Park is open 24 hours a day for camping and many other outdoor activities.

References

External links

 
 Alexander Springs Wilderness - official site at Ocala National Forest

IUCN Category Ib
Protected areas of Lake County, Florida
Wilderness areas of Florida
Ocala National Forest
Springs of Florida
Landforms of Lake County, Florida
Protected areas established in 1984
1984 establishments in Florida